The Dabie Mountains shrew mole (Uropsilus dabieshanensis) is a species of mammal in the family Talpidae and genus Uropsilus. It is endemic to Anhui Province in China, where, as its name suggests, it is only known from the Dabie Mountains.

Phylogenetic evidence supports it being a sister species to a clade containing the gracile shrew mole (U. gracilis), black-backed shrew mole (U. atronates), and several undescribed species, with U. dabieshanensis diverging from the rest of the genus in the early Pleistocene.

References 

Uropsilus
Mammals of China
Endemic fauna of China
Mammals described in 2021